Post Alley is a short street in Seattle. The northern end of the street runs under and through Pike Place Market. The alley is mostly paved with bricks. It was called "Seattle's best-known alley for its pedestrian environment and abutting shops and restaurants" out of all 425 alleys in the city, and has been described as having a "European feel".

The street was originally named Post Street or Post Avenue for the first U.S. post office in Seattle, opened in 1880 on the corner of Yesler Way, which may also have been the city's first United States Government building. The alley reaches a pedestrian-only area at the Harbor Steps development a block uphill from the Seattle ferry terminal, Colman Dock.

There are notable locations on the alley including Cafe Campagne, The Pink Door, Ghost Alley Espresso, the Gum Wall, Pike Place Chowder, and Post Alley Pizza. The Federal Office Building was built on an entire city block that was bisected by Post Alley until the early 1930s. Other notable entities on still-extant Post Avenue south of the Federal Office Building include Seattle Steam Company.

See also
Main Seattle Post Office (1903, rebuilt 1959)

References

External links
 

1880 establishments in Washington Territory
Central Waterfront, Seattle
Pike Place Market
Streets in Seattle